Gentle Strangers is a 1972 Australian film directed by Cecil Holmes.

Plot
A Chinese boy and a Thai girl have a romance when they meet in a seedy boarding house in Sydney. An Indonesian student is posted to a rural research centre while his wife and child cope with life in the city.

Cast
Yee Choo Koo as Preeyan
Clem Chow as Lawrence
Rick Lay as himself
Eric Lay as himself
Yanti Lay as herself
Jennifer West as Miss Emerson
Lyn Murphy as Mrs Baker

Production
Cecil Holmes spent a year researching and writing the film, which was made for Film Australia. It was shot on 16mm with a mostly non professional cast.

Release
The film was released through non commercial film libraries and screened on commercial television but did not screen in cinemas.

References

External links

Gentle Strangers at Oz Movies

Australian drama films
1970s English-language films
1970s Australian films